Frederick Austin (1902–1990) was a British painter.

Frederick Austin may also refer to:

Fred Thaddeus Austin (1866–1938), American military officer
Frederic Austin (1872–1952), English baritone singer